Lake Oliver is a  reservoir on the Chattahoochee River, which lies south of Goat Rock Dam (Goat Rock Lake).  The lake is created by the Oliver Dam and Generating Plant, which was completed in 1959 by Georgia Power.

The lake was named for James McCoy Oliver, an executive of Georgia Power at the time. At the southern end of the reservoir, Lake Oliver is relatively wide but quickly narrows and becomes almost riverine at the northern end of the lake, at the foot of the Goat Rock Dam upstream.

Public access to the lake is limited to one marina owned by the City of Columbus.  Since Lake Oliver is entirely within the city limits of Columbus, Georgia, the shore is densely settled on both the Georgia and Alabama sides.  Green Island Hills, an upscale development, is located on the lake at the mouth of Standing Boy Creek.  Given the amount of settlement, there are many private access points to the lake.

In the summer, the lake is very crowded with recreational activity.  The other three seasons usually see anglers fishing for sunfish.  Lake Oliver also serves as the municipal water supply for Columbus.

The location of Oliver Dam is approximately at the Fall Line of the Chattahoochee River.

Lake Oliver is the northernmost point of the Chattahoochee Riverwalk a fifteen-mile long bicycle pathway that extends southward to Fort Benning.

LOliver
Geography of Columbus, Georgia
Bodies of water of Lee County, Alabama
Oliver
Oliver
Protected areas of Muscogee County, Georgia
Tourist attractions in Columbus, Georgia
Oliver
Oliver
Bodies of water of Muscogee County, Georgia